Violette Nozière is a 1978 French crime film directed by Claude Chabrol and starring Isabelle Huppert and Stéphane Audran. The film, based on a true French murder case in 1933, is about an eighteen-year-old girl named Violette and her encounters with a number of older men. The film had a total of 1,074,507 admissions in France.

Plot
Violette Nozière (Isabelle Huppert) is a French teen in the 1930s who secretly works as a prostitute while living with her unsuspecting parents, father Baptiste Nozière (Jean Carmet) and mother Germaine Nozière (Stéphane Audran).  Rebelling against her "mean and petty" petit-bourgeois parents, she falls in love with a spendthrift young man, whom she virtually supports with thefts from her parents as well as her prostitution earnings.

Meanwhile, her parents are informed by Violette's doctor that she has syphilis. Violette manages to half-persuade her suspicious mother and indulgent father that she has somehow inherited the disease from them. On this pretext, she tricks them into taking "medicine" that is actually poison, killing her father; her mother, however, survives, and Violette is arrested and charged with murder.  She defends herself by alleging that her father had molested her; Chabrol's abrupt use of flashbacks makes it uncertain whether Violette is lying.  She is convicted of murder and sentenced to die by guillotine but a voiceover at the end tells us that her sentence was commuted by degrees to the point that she ultimately left prison, married, and had five children.

Cast
Isabelle Huppert as Violette Nozière
Jean Carmet as Baptiste Nozière
Stéphane Audran as Germaine Nozière
Jean-François Garreaud as Jean Dabin
Zoe Chauveau as Zoe the Maid
Jean-Pierre Coffe as Dr. Deron
Jean Dalmain as Mr. Emile
Guy Hoffman as the Judge
Henri-Jacques Huet as Commissioner Guilleaume
Bernadette Lafont as Violette's Cellmate
Bernard Lajarrige as Andre De Pinguet
Bernard Alane as Pinguet's Son
Lisa Langlois as Maddy
Fabrice Luchini as Camus
Dominique Zardi as Boy in Cafe

Awards and nominations
The film was entered into the main competition at the 1978 Cannes Film Festival, where Isabelle Huppert won the award for Best Actress. At the César Awards, Stéphane Audran was awarded Best Supporting Actress. The film was also nominated in three other categories: Best Actress (Isabelle Huppert), Best Music (Pierre Jansen) and Best Production Design (Jacques Brizzio).

The New York Times placed the film on its Best 1000 Movies Ever list.

See also
 Isabelle Huppert on screen and stage

References

External links
 
 

1978 films
1978 crime drama films
French crime drama films
Crime films based on actual events
Films set in the 1930s
Films directed by Claude Chabrol
Films about prostitution in France
Canadian crime drama films
Cultural depictions of French women
Cultural depictions of prostitutes
Cultural depictions of assassins
Cultural depictions of female criminals
Biographical films about criminals
Fiction about familicide
French-language Canadian films
1970s Canadian films
1970s French films